This is a list of television programs broadcast by Disney Channel, a Canadian version of the United States cable channel of the same name. Its French-language feed, La Chaîne Disney, has a slightly different schedule than the English-language version.

Current programming
As of March 2023:

Programming from Disney Channel (U.S.)

Live-action series

Animated series

Acquired programming
An asterisk (*) means that the program is a Disney Junior program.

Live-action series

Animated series

Reruns of ended series

Programming from Disney Channel (U.S.)

Acquired from Disney XD

Acquired programming

Acquired from Disney Junior (U.S.)

Upcoming programming

Programming from Disney Channel (U.S.)

Live-action series

Animated series

Former programming

Programming from Disney Channel (U.S.)

Live-action series

Animated series

Acquired programming
A * Means That The Program Is A Disney Junior Program.

Live-action series

Animated series

Acquired from Disney XD

Acquired from Disney Junior

References

 
Disney Channel
Disney Channel related-lists